Bommes is a commune in the Gironde department in Nouvelle-Aquitaine in southwestern France.

Bommes is located in the Sauternes wine appellation of Bordeaux.

Population

See also
Communes of the Gironde department

References

Communes of Gironde